Axinopalpus is a genus of beetles in the family Carabidae, containing the following species:

 Axinopalpus biplagiatus (Dejean, 1825)
 Axinopalpus brevicollis (Germain, 1855)
 Axinopalpus brunneus Chaudoir, 1876
 Axinopalpus californicus (Motschulsky, 1845)
 Axinopalpus coloradensis Casey, 1920
 Axinopalpus crusoei Reed, 1874
 Axinopalpus demissus Casey, 1920
 Axinopalpus denticulatus Hatch, 1949
 Axinopalpus fusciceps Leconte, 1851
 Axinopalpus habilis Casey, 1920
 Axinopalpus humeralis (Solier, 1849)
 Axinopalpus illectus Casey, 1920
 Axinopalpus jucundus Bates, 1883
 Axinopalpus mexicanus Bates, 1883
 Axinopalpus ovipennis Chaudoir, 1876
 Axinopalpus pratti Hatch, 1949
 Axinopalpus pusillus (Dejean, 1831)
 Axinopalpus utahensis Tanner, 1928
 Axinopalpus vittatus Hatch, 1949

References

Lebiinae